Johannes Schöllhorn (born 30 June 1962) is a contemporary German composer.

Born in Murnau am Staffelsee, Schöllhorn grew up in Marktoberdorf. He studied musical composition with Klaus Huber, Emmanuel Nunes and Mathias Spahlinger and music theory with Peter Förtig at the Hochschule für Musik Freiburg. He also attended conducting courses with Péter Eötvös.

He taught at the Zurich University of the Arts from 1995 to 2000 and from 2001 to 2009 as a professor for composition at the Hochschule für Musik, Theater und Medien Hannover. Since 2009 he has been a professor at the Hochschule für Musik und Tanz Köln.

Prizes 
 1997: Comité de Lecture of the Ensemble intercontemporain
 2009: .

Notable students 
 Farzia Fallah (born 1980), composer from Tehran, living in Germany
 Georgia Koumará (born 1991), Greek composer, living in Germany

External links 
 
 Extensive interview with Johannes Schöllhorn
 
 Johannes Schöllhorn on Éditions Lamoine
 Johannes Schöllhorn on Centre de documentation de la musique contemporaine
 Johannes Schöllhorn on Goethe Institut

20th-century classical composers
German music educators
Academic staff of the Hochschule für Musik, Theater und Medien Hannover
Academic staff of the Hochschule für Musik und Tanz Köln
1962 births
Living people
People from Upper Bavaria
People from Garmisch-Partenkirchen (district)
20th-century German composers